In mathematics, more precisely, in the theory of simplicial sets, a simplicial group is a simplicial object in the category of groups. Similarly, a simplicial abelian group is a simplicial object in the category of abelian groups. A simplicial group is a Kan complex (in particular, its homotopy groups make sense). The Dold–Kan correspondence says that a simplicial abelian group may be identified with a chain complex. In fact it can be shown that
any simplicial abelian group  is non-canonically homotopy equivalent to a product of Eilenberg–MacLane spaces, 

A commutative monoid in the category of simplicial abelian groups is a simplicial commutative ring.

 discusses a simplicial analogue of the fact that a cohomology class on a Kähler manifold has a unique harmonic representative and deduces Kirchhoff's circuit laws from these observations.

References 

 
 
 Charles Weibel, An introduction to homological algebra

External links 

What is a simplicial commutative ring from the point of view of homotopy theory?

Simplicial sets